Limnopus is an ichnogenus of ancient tetrapod footprint. Its footprints have been found in Moscovian aged-rocks situated in Alveley, Shropshire, England, Colorado and West Virginia. The Limnopus tracks were probably made by Diadectes.

The Limnopus glenshawensis type specimen was accompanied by tracks of that of the related Ichniotherium. The type specimen of Limnopus and Ichniotherium is currently housed in the Lapworth Museum of Geology in Birmingham, England. A 3D printed model of an Ichnotherium track can also be seen.

References

 Lockley, Martin  and Hunt, Adrian.  Dinosaur Tracks of Western North America. Columbia University Press. 1999.

Trace fossils
Eryopids